The 2003 Bedford Borough Council election took place on 1 May 2003 to elect members of Bedford Borough Council in England. This was on the same day as  other local elections.

Prior to the election, five councillors - four from the Conservatives and one from the Liberal Democrats - left their respective groups and formed the Better Bedford Independent Party.

Summary

Election result

BBIP = Better Bedford Independent Party

Ward results

Brickhill

Bromham

Carlton

Castle

 
 
 

 

M. Davey was the incumbent councillor, originally elected for the Conservatives, but defected to the BBIP. Because this seat is compared to the last time it was up for election it is shown as a BBIP gain.

Cauldwell

Clapham

De Parys

Goldington

Great Barford

Harpur

Kempston South

Kingsbrook

Putnoe

Roxton

Sharnbrook

Turvey

Wilhamstead

Wootton

References

Bedford
Bedford Borough Council elections